Alnus heterodonta is an extinct species of alder from the early Oligocene Bridge Creek floras of Central Oregon

References 

Oligocene plants
heterodonta